Don Carter (born February 24, 1936) is a Canadian retired professional hockey winger who played 639 games in the Eastern Hockey League with the Greensboro Generals from 1959 to 1973.

External links
 

1936 births
Living people
Canadian ice hockey right wingers
Eastern Hockey League coaches
Greensboro Generals (EHL) players
Ice hockey people from Toronto
Ice hockey player-coaches
Southern Hockey League (1973–1977) coaches
Winston-Salem Polar Twins (SHL) players
Canadian ice hockey coaches